Givat Hen (lit. HN Hill) is a moshav in central Israel. Located near Ra'anana, it falls under the jurisdiction of Drom HaSharon Regional Council.

History
Givat Hen was founded in 1933 by immigrants from Lithuania, Poland and Russia and was part of the Settlement of the Thousand plan. They were later joined by immigrants from Germany. 

The name of the moshav is based on the initials of Hayyim Nahman Bialik (HN), and the streets are named for poems by him.

Notable residents
Uri Adelman

References

Moshavim
Populated places established in 1933
Populated places in Central District (Israel)
1933 establishments in Mandatory Palestine
German-Jewish culture in Israel
Lithuanian-Jewish culture in Israel
Polish-Jewish culture in Israel
Russian-Jewish culture in Israel